Field magnet refers to a magnet used to produce a magnetic field in a device. It may be a permanent magnet or an electromagnet. When the field magnet is an electromagnet, it is referred to as a field coil.

Although the term usually refers to magnets used in motors and generators, it may refer to magnets used in any of the following devices:

Alternator
Cathode ray tube
Dynamo
Electric motor
Electrical generator
Fusion reactor
Loudspeaker
Maglev trains
Magnetic Separator
Magneto
Mass spectrometer
Metal detector
MRI scanner
Particle accelerator
Read/write head
Relay
Solenoid
Stepping switch
Tape head

See also

Rotor (electric)
Stator

Electromagnetism
Types of magnets